The SWCW Southwest Junior Heavyweight Championship was a secondary title in Southwest Championship Wrestling, challenged for by lighter weight wrestlers. It lasted from 1981 until 1985, when it was abandoned after SWCW was sold to Texas All-Star Wrestling.

Title history
Silver areas in the history indicate periods of unknown lineage.

External links
SWCW Southwest Junior Heavyweight title history

Southwest Junior Heavyweight Championship
Junior heavyweight wrestling championships
Regional professional wrestling championships